XENV-AM is a radio station on 1340 AM in Monterrey, Nuevo León. It is known as Radio 13 + Vallenata and carries a format of cumbia and vallenato music.

History
XENV received its concession on December 15, 1959. It was owned by Gonzalo Estrada Cruz until 2004, when it was transferred to members of the Estrada family.

References

Radio stations in Monterrey